Bahaddarhat is a suburb in Chittagong City of Southeastern Bangladesh. Bahaddarhat was the site of the 2012 Bahaddarhat Flyover collapse, in which girders supporting an overpass that was under construction collapsed.

References

Chittagong District